Balurghat Mahila Mahavidyalaya is a women's college in Balurghat in the Dakshin Dinajpur district of West Bengal, India. The college is affiliated to University of Gour Banga,  offering undergraduate courses.

Departments

Arts

Bengali 
English
Sanskrit
History
Political Science
Economics
Philosophy
Geography
Education
Home Science
Mass Communication

Science

Zoology
Botany
Chemistry

Accreditation
In 2017 the college has been awarded B+ by the National Assessment and Accreditation Council. The college is also recognized by the University Grants Commission (UGC).

See also

References

External links 
 
University of Gour Banga
University Grants Commission
National Assessment and Accreditation Council

Colleges affiliated to University of Gour Banga
Academic institutions formerly affiliated with the University of North Bengal
Educational institutions established in 1970
Women's universities and colleges in West Bengal
Universities and colleges in Dakshin Dinajpur district
1970 establishments in West Bengal
Balurghat